Martin Guerre was a 16th century French peasant.

Martin Guerre may also refer to:

Martin Guerre (musical), by Claude-Michel Schönberg and Alain Boublil

See also
The Wife of Martin Guerre, 1941 novel by American Janet Lewis
The Return of Martin Guerre, 1982 French film
The House of Martin Guerre, musical by Leslie Arden & Anna Theresa Cascio